A Wilder Alias is an album by American vocalists Jackie Cain and Roy Kral featuring performances recorded in 1973 and released on the CTI label.

Reception
The Allmusic review states "A Wilder Alias features the brilliant vocal interplay and crisply harmonized lines the two were known for, albeit in a more modal and experimental setting befitting the aesthetic of the time period... These are ambitious, funky, and somewhat fusion-style cuts that fans of '70s jazz should certainly check out".

Track listing
All compositions by Roy Kral except where noted
 "A Wilder Alias" - 5:13 
 "Niki's Song" (Jackie Cain, Kral) - 6:25 
 "Waltz for Dana" - 4:22 
 "The Way We Are" - 6:12 
 "Good and Rich" (Richard Druz, Kral) - 10:42 
Recorded at Van Gelder Studio in Englewood Cliffs, New Jersey in December 1973

Personnel
Jackie Cain  - vocals
Roy Kral - vocals, electric piano, arranger
Roy Pennington - vibraphone
Joe Farrell - tenor saxophone, soprano saxophone
Hubert Laws - flute
Harvie Swartz - bass
Steve Gadd - drums
Don Sebesky - supervision

References

CTI Records albums
Jackie and Roy albums
1974 albums
Albums produced by Creed Taylor
Albums arranged by Don Sebesky
Albums recorded at Van Gelder Studio